Ironton Junction is an unincorporated community in Coal Township, Jackson County, Ohio, United States.

As of 1909, Ironton Junction was a station on the CH&D Railroad.

References 

Unincorporated communities in Jackson County, Ohio